Harry Price (1881–1948) was a British psychic researcher and author.

Harry Price may also refer to:

Harry Price (cricketer) (1923–1991), Western Australia fast bowler
Harry Price (fictional character), a character in the Sharpe novels
Harry Price (Royal Navy seaman) (1877–1965), Royal Navy sailor and author

See also
Henry Price (disambiguation)